Kenneth Ray Callahan (April 28, 1933 – September 2, 2017) was an American football player and coach.  He was recruited by Coach Paul Bear Bryant at the University of Kentucky in 1952 under a full scholarship. Coach Bryant mentored him often taking him fishing and along on other recruiting trips to convince players to come to U.K. to play. He later coached for his alma mater as an assistant coach from 1963 to 1966. He then moved to University of Cincinnati as an assistant coach for 2 years before becoming the head football coach from 1969 to 1972, compiling a record of 20–23. His first pro team was in 1973 with the Baltimore Colts as a linebacker coach under former teammate Howard Schnellenberger. Callahan then took a chance with the World Football League Florida Blazers with Jack Pardee.  The Blazers made it to the World Bowl losing to the Birmingham Americans by 1 point but with controversy in the officiating. Coach Callahan then bolted back to the NFL with the Chicago Bears as the offensive line coach in front of Walter Peyton for his first 3 years as a player. The Washington Redskins was his next stop for 3 years of offensive line coach again with Jack Pardee at the helm.  Callahan then headed south to Texas with the Houston Oilers as the defensive line coach for 2 years.  Joe Walton then called upon Ray Callahan to lead up the defensive line "sack exchange" consisting of Barry Bennett, Marty Lyons, Joe Klecko, Mark Gastineau, of the New York Jets for the next 7 years. Callahan retired to Bracey, Va on Lake Gaston and enjoyed lake life with his high school sweetheart wife Essie "Lee" Dorsey.  Callahan died on September 2, 2017.

Head coaching record

References

1933 births
2017 deaths
Baltimore Colts coaches
Chicago Bears coaches
Cincinnati Bearcats football coaches
Florida Blazers coaches
Houston Oilers coaches
Kentucky Wildcats football coaches
Kentucky Wildcats football players
New York Jets coaches
Washington Redskins coaches
People from Lebanon, Kentucky
Coaches of American football from Kentucky
Players of American football from Kentucky